The 2000–01 George Mason Patriots Men's basketball team represents George Mason University during the 2000–01 NCAA Division I men's basketball season. This was the 35th season for the program, the fourth under head coach Jim Larrañaga. The Patriots played their home games at the Patriot Center in Fairfax, Virginia.

Honors and awards 
Colonial Athletic Association Player of the Year
 George Evans

Colonial Athletic Association All-Conference First Team
 George Evans
 Erik Herring

Colonial Athletic Association Defensive Player of the Year
 George Evans

Colonial Athletic Association All-Defensive Team
 George Evans

Colonial Athletic Association Dean Ehlers Award
 George Evans

AP All-America Team - Honorable Mention
 George Evans

Roster

Player statistics

Schedule and results

|-
!colspan=12 style=| Non-conference regular season

|-
!colspan=12 style=|CAA regular season

|-
!colspan=12 style=|2001 CAA tournament

|-
!colspan=12 style=|2001 NCAA tournament

References

George Mason Patriots men's basketball seasons
George Mason
George Mason
George Mason men's basketball
George Mason men's basketball